Protein piccolo is a protein that in humans is encoded by the PCLO gene.

Function 

Synaptic vesicles dock and fuse in the active zone of the plasma membrane at chemical synapses. The presynaptic cytoskeletal matrix (PCM), which is associated with the active zone and is situated between synaptic vesicles, is thought to be involved in maintaining the neurotransmitter release site in register with the postsynaptic reception apparatus. The cycling of synaptic vesicles is a multistep process involving a number of proteins (see MIM 603215). Among the components of the PCM that orchestrate these events are Bassoon (BSN; MIM 604020), RIM (RIMS1; MIM 606629), Oboe (RIMS2; MIM 606630), and Piccolo (PCLO).[supplied by OMIM]

Interactions 

The protein product of PCLO called Piccolo has been shown to interact with number of proteins including GIT1,  the F-actin-binding protein Abp1, PRA1, TRIO, DAAM1, and Profilin.

Clinical relevance 

Recurrent mutations in this gene have been associated to cases of diffuse large B-cell lymphoma. Recent evidence has shown that a homozygous, nonsense PCLO mutation is the genetic cause of the autosomal recessive neurodegenerative disorder, pontocerebellar hypoplasia type III (PCH3).

References

Further reading

External links